Shahinabad (also Romanized as Shāhīnābād) is a village in Torkaman Rural District, in the Central District of Urmia County, West Azerbaijan Province, Iran. At the 2006 census, its population was 222, in 54 families.

References 

Populated places in Urmia County